Honolulu is a 1939 American musical comedy film directed by Edward Buzzell and starring dancer Eleanor Powell, Robert Young, George Burns and Gracie Allen. The picture was produced by Metro-Goldwyn-Mayer. Also appearing in the film are Rita Johnson, Eddie "Rochester" Anderson, Sig Rumann and Ruth Hussey.

Plot
Inspired by stories about doppelgängers and identical twins such as The Prince and the Pauper, Honolulu features Young in a dual role as Brooks Mason—a top movie star—and as Hawaii-based businessman George Smith. Mason is tired of being in the public eye, so when he discovers that Smith is close enough to be his twin, he arranges to switch places with Smith temporarily. When Mason steps into Smith's life, he finds himself in a tug-of-war between Smith's fiancée, and a dancer named Dorothy March (Powell), with whom he has fallen in love. Meanwhile, Smith discovers that being a famous movie star is not all that it is made out to be.

Notes
Eleanor Powell's dance routines were given a mostly Hawaiian flavor. One of her routines was performed in blackface in tribute to Powell's idol, Bill 'Bojangles' Robinson. The comedy of Burns and Allen is also featured, although the two actors work separately for much of the movie, their characters only meeting in the final minutes. Powell and Gracie Allen sing and dance together in a sequence featuring the titular song. This was George Burns' last film appearance for 37 years until his Oscar-winning performance in The Sunshine Boys in 1975. The film is also notable for offering a somewhat rare cinematic look at pre-World War II Honolulu.

There is a notable musical sequence featuring Gracie Allen, accompanied by musicians made to look like the Marx Brothers (including two Grouchos), while several actors in the audience are costumed to look like such famous actors as Clark Gable, W.C. Fields and Oliver Hardy.

Footage of one of Powell's dance routines (done in a hula skirt to a tiki drum orchestra) would be reused in the later comedy, I Dood It, while another dance performance that was cut from the film appeared seven years later in the "hodge-podge" production The Great Morgan.

Cast
 Eleanor Powell as Miss Dorothy 'Dot' March
 Robert Young as Brooks Mason / George Smith / David in the movie
 George Burns as Joe Duffy
 Gracie Allen as Millicent 'Millie' De Grasse
 Rita Johnson as Cecelia Grayson
 Clarence Kolb as Mr. Horace Grayson
 Jo Ann Sayers as Nurse
 Ann Morriss as Gale Brewster
 Willie Fung as Wong, Mason's Hawaiian servant
 Cliff Clark as First Detective
 Edward Gargan as Second Detective
 Eddie Anderson as Washington, Mason's Hollywood servant
 Sig Rumann as Professor Timmer, psychiatrist 
 Ruth Hussey as Eve, David's wife in the movie
 Russell Hicks as  Clifford Jones
 Kealoha Holt as Native Dancing Girl
 Edward LeSaint as 	Minister 
 Edgar Dearing as Jailer
 Tom Neal as Ambulance Intern
 Betty Jaynes as Singer

Bibliography
 Pugh, Megan. America Dancing: From the Cakewalk to the Moonwalk. Yale University Press, 2015.

References

External links
 
 
 
 

1939 films
American musical comedy films
1930s English-language films
Metro-Goldwyn-Mayer films
American black-and-white films
Films directed by Edward Buzzell
1939 musical comedy films
Films set in Hawaii
1930s American films